Titirangi Rudolf Steiner School (TRSS) is a privately funded school with a special character, a Waldorf school located in Auckland, New Zealand

A co-educational, non-denominational and independent education for children aged birth to eighteen (Playgroup to High School) based on the educational philosophy of Rudolf Steiner.

Titirangi Rudolf Steiner School provides a comprehensive Waldorf education Curriculum and environment  which encourages and promotes independent thinking and social responsibility. The School understands children as beings of body, soul and spirit and guides them to develop compassion and reverence for themselves and the world community through realising their social, academic and artistic potential.

History

The school opened in 1987, beginning as a play centre in the Titirangi Beach Hall. The school subsequently moved to Parau, and then to its current site, which was formerly owned by the Crown Lynn ceramics company.

Location
It is located on a site of over 29 hectares in West Auckland's Waitākere Ranges.

Demographics
According to the 2018 Education Review Office report the school had 179 pupils out of which 18 were international. Out of those, 58% were female and 42% were male. The racial markup was 79% Pākehā, 4% Māori, 12% Asian, 3% Pacific and 2% of other races. ERO also found that the school meets the registration as a private school criteria.

The school's Kindergarten was reviewed separately by ERO who stated that 80% of teachers there were qualified. When it came to demographics, they were slightly different from the main school. The Titirangi Rudolf Steiner Kindergarten 1 had 53 pupils at the time of a review, 28 of which were male and 25 female. Out of those, 40% were Pākehā, 3% were Māori, 2% were Japanese, 6% of European descent and 2% were of other races.

See also
Curriculum of the Waldorf schools
Rudolf Steiner
Anthroposophy

References

Educational institutions established in 1987
Primary schools in Auckland
Secondary schools in Auckland
Waldorf schools in New Zealand
1987 establishments in New Zealand
Schools in West Auckland, New Zealand